Ulrika R. "Ullie" Akerstrom (March 17, 1864 – August 10, 1941) was an American actress, dancer, playwright, and vaudeville performer.

Career

Ulrika Akerstrom was born and raised in New York City, and made her first stage appearance in Milwaukee, Wisconsin as a vaudeville performer. She acted in shows including Fanchon the Cricket, The Pearl of Savoy, The Hidden Hand, Annette, the Dancing Girl (1889, her New York debut), Renah, the Gipsey's Daughter, A Little Busybody (1891), A Strange Marriage, Under the City Lights (1898), A Beautiful Slave, a Waif of London (1898), and A Bachelor's Housekeeper (1898).

Akerstrom wrote several plays and sketches during her performing years, including Viola, the Street Singer (1886), Renah, the Gipsey's Daughter (1886), Annette the Dancing Girl (1889), Miss Rosa, A Pauper's Fortune (1893), Queen of the Arena (1893), A Woman's Vengeance (1895), The Story of a Crime (1895), That Smith Gal, Little Busybody, The Egyptian Dancer, and The Doctor's Warm Reception (1901). Akerstrom also published a book of popular verse, "Toot Yer Horn", and Other Poems (1888).

She retired from the stage in 1903 and lived in Brooklyn, writing sketches, plays, and lyrics. She also produced shows. Works by Akerstrom from this period included A Doctor by Courtesy; or, A Jolly Mixup (1906), The Widow (1910), St. Elmo (1910), The Plot (1910), An Election Episode (1910), Adventures; or, The Woman Hater (1910), Vashti; or, Until Death Do Us Part (1910), The Reckoning (1911), Mental Suggestion; or, Made in Germany (1911), Mrs. Murphy's Second Husband (1911), Natasha (1911), The Eleventh Hour; or, Two Sisters (1911), A Story of the Hills (1911), The Wager (1912), The Sultan's Daughter (1912), The Sultan's Favorite (1912), Sunshine (1912), Our New Girl (1912), The Red Mask (1913), Caught with the Goods (1915), Over the Hills to the Poor House (1921),  The Haunted Fliver; or, What's the Answer (1935) and Call of the King (1938).

She moved to Florida by 1935, but remained active in local theatrical productions, as a performer, writer and producer.

Personal life
Akerstrom married her manager, Gus Bernard, by 1899; he died in 1915. She married again, to George Howard Melius. She died in 1941, in Willsboro, New York, aged 71 years. She was buried in Woodlawn Cemetery Bronx, New York, United States.

References

External links

1864 births
1941 deaths
19th-century American actresses
American stage actresses
American women dramatists and playwrights
Vaudeville performers
20th-century American actresses
19th-century American dramatists and playwrights
19th-century American women writers
20th-century American dramatists and playwrights
20th-century American women writers
Actresses from New York City
Writers from New York City